Brød og sirkus was a Norwegian debate programme which was broadcast by NRK2 from autumn 2002 until spring 2006. The presenter was Knut Olsen.

The first programme was broadcast on 2 November 2002 and the last was broadcast on 10 May 2006.

The series was broadcast live from Studentersamfundet i Trondhjem in a so-called "town hall meeting style". Various themes around current affairs and politics were discussed each episode with live debates taking place.

External links
 Brød og sirkus at nrk.no
Willochs oppgjør med rovdyrkapitalismen (NRK, 2004)
Ryddegutter for USA? (NRK, 2004)
Oppgjøret om olje i Nord (NRK, 2006)

NRK original programming